Xiaoshan may refer to the following locations in China:

 Xiaoshan District (萧山区), Hangzhou
 Hangzhou Xiaoshan International Airport (杭州萧山国际机场)
 Xiaoshan Subdistrict (小山街道), Lunan District, Tangshan, Hebei
 Xiaoshan Township, Tiandeng County (小山乡), Guangxi
 Xiaoshan Township, Haixing County (小山乡), Hebei
 Xiao Mountain (崤山), range in the west of Henan